The 2000 British Speedway Championship was the 40th edition of the British Speedway Championship. The Final took place on 20 May at Brandon in Coventry, England. The Championship was won by Chris Louis, with Paul Hurry and Martin Dugard finishing second and third respectively.

Final 
20 May 2000
 Brandon Stadium, Coventry

{| width=100%
|width=50% valign=top|

See also 
 British Speedway Championship

References 

British Speedway Championship
Great Britain